Solaris is an album by the British drum and bass artist Photek, released in 2000. It was released on 19 September 2000 on the Virgin Records sublabel Science in Europe and on Astralwerks in the US.

Production
Rupert Parkes produced Solaris, trading in the drum and bass sound of the previous album in favor of techno and house influences.

Reception 
According to Metacritic. the album received a MetaScore of 70, meaning generally favorable reviews, based on 10 professional reviews. Metacritic ranked Solaris the 95th Best Album of 2000.

Track listing 
 "Terminus"  – 5:26
 "Junk"  – 5:27
 "Glamourama"  – 5:30
 "Mine to Give"   – 6:41
 featuring Robert Owens (vocals)
 "Can't Come Down"  – 6:59
 featuring Robert Owens (vocals) 
 "Infinity"  – 8:31
 "Solaris"  – 5:12
 "Aura"  – 0:47
 "Halogen"  – 4:38
 "Lost Blue Heaven"  – 3:13
 "Under the Palms"  – 2:37

References

External links 
 
 

Photek albums
2000 albums
Astralwerks albums